"Heartbroken" is the debut single by British record producer T2. It was written by British singer Jodie Aysha, who also provides the vocals. The song spent three  weeks at number two on the UK Singles Chart, behind Leona Lewis's "Bleeding Love".

"Heartbroken" is the most requested song ever on BBC Radio 1.

The song was later rewritten to support boxer Ricky Hatton in his match against Floyd Mayweather. It was also sampled by DJ Khaled and Drake on their 2017 song "To the Max", and Digga D and ArrDee on their 2021 song "Wasted".

Background
Jodie Aysha wrote "Heartbroken" in 2004, aged just 15, inspired by her sister's break-up with her boyfriend. After meeting T2 later that year, Jodie showed him her lyrics and he recorded them at his apartment in Leeds. In 2006, he remixed her vocals to create a song in the style of bassline, a music genre similar to UK garage and which was popular in Yorkshire at the time.

Music video
The music video features cameos by footballers Micah Richards and Anton Ferdinand.

Track listings

Charts

Weekly charts

Year-end charts

Certifications

References

2007 songs
2007 debut singles
All Around the World Productions singles
UK garage songs